Acrodontium simplex is an ascomycete fungus that is a plant pathogen.

References 

Fungal plant pathogens and diseases
Ascomycota enigmatic taxa
Fungi described in 1952